Small-wheel bicycles are adult bicycles that have wheels of  nominal diameter or less, which is smaller than the 700c (522 mm),  sizes common on most full-sized adult bikes. While many folding bicycles are small-wheel bicycles, not all small-wheel bicycles can fold. Some small-wheel bicycles neither fold nor separate, such as the Moulton, which comes in both fixed-frame and separable-frame versions. While BMX bikes also have  wheels, they are not normally categorised as "small-wheel bikes".

History
An early proponent of small-wheeled adult bicycles was Paul de Vivie, better known by his pen name "Vélocio". His approach was to use a balloon-width tire of about 57 mm (2.25") on a 500 mm (20") rim, giving a wheel of approximately 600 mm (24") in diameter.

The man credited with being the father of modern small-wheel bicycles is Alex Moulton who pioneered the field with his F-framed Moulton Bicycle in 1962. His original small-wheeled design notably featured full suspension. Raleigh introduced the RSW-16 as a direct competitor, but it lacked the suspension of the Moulton and compensated for this by using very wide 2-inch "balloon" tires. The RSW-16 "Compact" was a folding version. In 1968 Raleigh introduced the Raleigh Twenty, which later went on to become one of Raleigh's biggest sellers. A large number of European manufacturers made U-frame small-wheeled and folding bicycles in the 1970s.

Advantages and disadvantages
Smaller wheels are more maneuverable. For this reason, and in some cases for comic effect, they are used in some clown bicycles. Smaller wheels more faithfully follow the terrain, giving a harsher ride on bumpy roads that are effectively smoothed by larger ones. It may be desirable for bicycles with smaller wheels to also be fitted with some form of suspension to improve riding characteristics. Bicycles with small wheels normally have their gearing adjusted to provide the same effective wheel radius as large ones, so pedalling cadence is not different. Smaller wheels tend to weigh less than larger ones, thus bringing the performance benefits of light wheels.

Small wheels, all else being equal, have slightly higher rolling resistance. On the other hand, they may have lower aerodynamic drag due to their smaller area, which is proportional to their radius.

See also 

 Bike Friday
 Birdy (bicycle)
 Brompton Bicycle
 Folding bicycle
 Moulton Bicycle
 Portable bicycle
 Strida
 Tern (company)
 List of bicycle manufacturing companies
 Outline of cycling

References

External links
 Usenet quote: "A larger wheel rides better on average roads and always corners better because it brings a longer contact patch to the road." Mechanical engineer Jobst Brandt on optimal wheel sizes

 Small wheel bicycles
 Small wheel bicycle